Adolfo Camilo Díaz López (born 1963 in Caborana, Aller, Asturias) is a Spanish writer in asturian language. He is specially known as a playwright and author of short novels. He had achieved some of the most important prizes of the Asturian literature, as the Xosefa Xovellanos of novel (twice, in 1985 and 1995) or the short novel prize of the Academia de la Llingua Asturiana.

Life
Adolfo Camilo Díaz studied History in the University of Oviedo. In 1979 he founded the experimental theatre group "Güestia", where he met Xuan Bello. The group was dissolved, and become a rock band with the same name, publishing a disc named Inaux. Later, in 1984, he formed up the drama collective "Amorecer", that played some spectacles. The most important one was El suañu la razón ('The Reason's Dream'), of 1985, based on texts of Goethe, Franz Kafka, Manuel Martínez Mediero as well as some of his own texts. He worked as a cultural entertainer in the municipalities of Carreño and Corvera and, since 2004, he is the cultural director of the city council of Avilés. He is also part of the Administration Council of the Radiotelevisión del Principado de Asturias. He founded the literature magazine "Al Bellume" (published between 1986 and 1989). Besides, he collaborates usually with newspapers as La Nueva España and Les Noticies) and he had published 17 books until now, most of them narrative or theater ones. He is also the asturian translator of some works of José Viale Moutinho and Jules Verne.

Books published 
 Narrative:
Añada pa un güeyu muertu ('Lullaby for a Dead Eye', Xosefa Xovellanos prize) (1985). Principáu d'Asturies. 
 L’otru Sherlock Holmes ('The Other Sherlock Holmes', with Vicente García Oliva and Rafael Mijares) (1986). Azucel.
 Pequeña lloba enllena d’amor ('Little Wolf Full of Love') (short novel prize of the Academia de la Llingua Asturiana) (1988). Academia de la Llingua Asturiana. 
 Miénteme, dime la verdá ('Lie to Me, Tell me the Truth') (1989). Azucel. 
 L’home que quería ser estatua ('The Man who Wanted to Be a Statue') (1991). Azucel.  
 Diariu de viaxe ('Diary of a Journey', Xosefa Xovellanos prize) (1995). Principáu d'Asturies. 
 El vientre del círculu ('The Circle's Belly') (1996). Editora del Norte. 
 Venus, Occidente y otros cuentos éticos ('Venus, Occident and some Other Ethical Short Stories') (1997). Trabe. 
 Nunca nun te fíes de la xente que nun enseña los dientes al rise ('Don't Trust Anyone Who Doesn't Show his Teeth when Smiling') (1998). Atenéu Obreru de Xixón. 
 Nueche ('Night') (2002). Ámbitu. 
 Suañé Cabu Verde. Nunca ye endemasiao tiempu ('I dreamed Cape Verde. Time is Never Too Much') (2003). Ámbitu. 
 Young adult literature
 Blugás (Prímula I) (1993). Trabe. 
 Theatre: 
Psicokiller ('Psycho-killer') (1993). Academia de la Llingua Asturiana. 
 País. Una traxicomedia asturiana ('Country. An Asturian Tragical Comedy') (2004). Madú. 
 Monologue
 Nelón y el sexu sentíu (y otros socedíos) ('Nelón and the Sex Sense (and some Other Facts)') (2002). Trabe. 
 Essay: 
 Pentimento I (1992). Azucel. 
 El cine fantaterrorífico español : una aproximación al género fantaterrorífico en España a través del cine de Paul Naschy ('Fantasterrific Spanish Cinema: Approximation to Fantastic and Terror Films Using Paul Naschy's Movies', in spanish language) (1993). Santa Bárbara. 
 El teatru popular asturianu ('Asturian Popular Theatre') (2002). Academia de la Llingua Asturiana. 
 Journalism:
 In articulo mortis (articles) (2005). Madú. 
 Translations:
 José Viale Moutinho: Mázcares venecianes (1989). Aína.
 José Viale Moutinho: Cuentos fantásticos (with Xandru Fernández) (1992). Academia de la Llingua Asturiana. 
 Jules Verne: L’eternu Adán (1992). Academia de la Llingua Asturiana. 
 José Viale Moutinho: Nombres de árboles quemados (in Spanish language) (1993). Ateneo Obrero de Gijón. 
 Paul Valéry: El cementeriu marín (2003). Trabe. 
 Raúl Vallarino: Los suaños del delanteru centru (2003). Trabe.

External links 
 Library of asturian writers Bibliography (until 1998) and a fragment of L'home que quería ser una estatua (in Asturian language)
 Interview with Adolfo Camilo Díaz (in Asturian language)

1963 births
Living people
People from Aller, Asturias
Spanish male writers
Writers from Asturias
Asturian language
University of Oviedo alumni